Aga Khan Prize may refer to:

Aga Khan Award for Architecture
Aga Khan Prize for Fiction, given out by the editors of The Paris Review